Flávia is a Portuguese-language girl's name. It is the equivalent of Flavia (name) found in Italy and Spain.

People
"Flávia", a 1987 song by Hermeto Pascoal from the album So Nao Toca Quem Nao Quer: Only If You Don't Want It
Flávia Delaroli (1983), Brazilian swimmer
Flávia Nadalutti (1961), Brazilian swimmer
Flávia Fernandes (1981), Brazilian water polo player
Flávia Moraes (1959), Brazilian Filmmaker

Portuguese feminine given names